Frederick George Ongley  was a Canadian Anglican priest in the 20th century.

McKean was educated at Trinity College, Toronto. Ordained in 1939,  his first post was a curacy at St Clement, Toronto. He was a Chaplain in the RCAF from 1942 to 1947. He was on the staff of St Matthew's Pro-Cathedral, Brandon from 1947 t0 1954; Rector of st John, Peterborough, Ontario from 1954 to 1963; and then of St George, Oshawa from 1963 to 1977. He was Archdeacon of Peterborough from 1956 to 1963; and then of Scarborough from 1969 to 1974.

References

Trinity College (Canada) alumni
Archdeacons of Scarborough, ON
Archdeacons of Peterborough, ON
20th-century Canadian Anglican priests
Royal Canadian Air Force chaplains